A shoulder sleeve insignia (often abbreviated SSI) is an embroidered patch worn on some uniforms of the United States Army. It is used by major formations of the U.S. Army; each formation has a unique formation patch. The U.S. Army is unique among the U.S. Armed Forces in that all soldiers are required to wear the patch of their headquarters as part of their military uniforms.

Shoulder sleeve insignia receive their name from the fact that they are most commonly worn on the upper left sleeve of the Army Combat Uniform (ACU) and Army Green uniform. However, they can be placed on other locations, notably on the side of a helmet. Shoulder sleeve insignia worn on the upper right sleeve of Army uniforms denote former wartime service. These "combat patches" are worn on the ACU and the new Army Greens but are not worn on the Army Service Uniform. Instead, a 2 inch metal replica is worn on the right breast pocket and is officially known as the Combat Service Identification Badge (CSIB).

Versions

Colored
Shoulder sleeve insignia were often designed with intricate designs including bright colors, when created. Because these bright colors and designs risk standing out when a soldier is in combat or in hiding, the shoulder sleeve insignia in its color form was commonly only worn on the dress uniform or service uniform when a soldier was not in combat. However, with the retirement of the Army Green Uniform in 2015, the full-color SSI was discontinued and was replaced with a CSIB. For combat uniforms, "subdued" versions have been created for wear on the battlefield. After a few years of retirement, the full-color SSI returned with the "pinks and greens" uniform that was re-introduced in the late 2010s.

"Full color" SSI were only worn on the brown service coat during the 1940s, and on the green "Class A" uniform and on the OG-107 during the late 1950s and early 1960s. Formerly, full color SSI were also worn on the "full color" (white letters on black or dark blue material) Military Police brassard, worn by MPs while wearing the green "Class A" service uniform or while wearing subdued field uniforms (BDU or DCU) in a garrison environment. However, with the ACU, the MP brassard was replaced by a rectangular patch made of fabric or infrared-reflective material, reading "MP". In one notable exception, the U.S. 1st Infantry Division wore full-color SSI on their BDUs and ACUs for a time, before that too was replaced with a subdued version.

Subdued
The subdued version of the SSI created for the Battle Dress Uniform (BDU) features patches that are primarily olive, dark brown and black, to match the BDU. In general, this version is obsolete because the Army phased out the BDU in the late 2000s in favor of the Army Combat Uniform (ACU).

The subdued version created for the Desert Camouflage Uniform (DCU) is primarily tan and "spice" brown, to match the uniform's design. This version is also obsolete, as the Army phased out DCUs in favor of ACUs.

The subdued version created for the Army Combat Uniform is the version widely used in the field today. Since the Army-wide adoption of the ACU, SSI for the ACU have been developed. These SSI are primarily foliage green, light brown, and black, though a few patches also feature red and maroon colors for some details. Unlike previous patches, the ACU SSI are velcro-backed, designed to attach to the velcro pockets on the shoulder of the uniform, instead of being sewn on. This makes them easier to remove and replace.

Since the development of the Operational Camouflage Pattern (OCP) uniform (commonly known as MultiCam as it is derived from Crye Precision's proprietary pattern) new SSI have been procured where the "Foliage" green of the ACU SSI is replaced by "Bagby" green.  Velcro remains the method for attaching the SSI to the uniform.

Wear 

The SSI is typically worn on the left upper arm, just below the uniform's shoulder seam on all but the ACU. The most common place for the SSI to be worn on the ACU is on the upper sleeve, attached using a velcro backing, however it is also sometimes worn on other places, notably when the soldier's body armor covers the shoulders, such as the shoulder pads of interceptor body armor, which covers the upper arm. Some units (such as the 3rd Infantry Division) also wear SSIs on their helmets. SSI are also occasionally worn on the backpacks or rucksacks of soldiers, but this is not standard practice and is usually personal preference.

Which SSI is worn depends on the chain of command that the soldier's formation is a part of. Usually, the soldier wears the SSI of their division or separate brigade, but if they fall under the command of a different division, they must wear the SSI of that division. The First Army has directed that all subordinate brigades wear the First Army SSI instead of their own authorized brigade SSI.

Former wartime service 
 

Those soldiers who are combat veterans are authorized permanent wear of the SSI of the unit they fought with on their right shoulder.  This shoulder sleeve insignia recognizes "former wartime service" and is frequently called a "combat patch". Per Army Regulation 670-1, a soldier is authorized to wear the SSI of their higher headquarters. This is not dependent on whether or not the higher headquarters deployed, or to whom the soldier was attached throughout his/her deployment. Exceptions have been made for operations of relatively short duration such as service in the Dominican Republic, Panama and Grenada.

With the transformation of the U.S. Army into a brigade-centered force, the SSI that soldiers may wear for wartime service has grown. Where soldiers once fought only under the command of their home division headquarters, this is no longer always the case. Early in the Global War on Terrorism, soldiers could earn the wartime service patch of several units during a single deployment according to their chain of command. Under current policy, soldiers may only earn one SSI per deployment.

Entire formations of soldiers are rarely deployed to the same command structure. For example, a battalion from a separate support brigade may be attached to a brigade combat team during on deployment, which, in turn, would be attached to a different division headquarters. It is a misconception that in that deployment, soldiers in the battalion could earn three patches at once; the patch of their regular headquarters (the separate brigade), the patch of the brigade combat team that they were attached to, and the patch of the division that the brigade combat team was attached to. In actuality, the regulation states that soldiers will wear the shoulder sleeve insignia of former wartime service of the lowest deployed echelon authorized its own distinctive SSI, which applies to divisions, separate brigades, and a handful of battalions. After March 27, 2007 the policy was changed to allow units of company level and higher to wear the SSI of their regular headquarters as a combat patch. This policy change also means that units above company level no longer receive multiple combat patches for single deployments, in turn simplifying what combat patch soldiers are actually entitled to wear.

Although all U.S. Army army groups, field armies, and corps have SSI, they do not award combat patches of these to all soldiers serving under them. These combat patches are usually only given to soldiers who serve the corps or army headquarters directly, and not one of the subordinate units.

There is no time-in-theater requirement for wear of the SSIFWTS and orders are not created to authorize it. U.S. soldiers are also not required to wear a SSIFWTS, and if they can wear more than one SSIFWTS then soldiers can alternate from one to another, but they cannot wear more than one at a time.

History 
The 81st Infantry Division "Wildcat" is generally agreed to have been first U.S. Army unit authorized an SSI.  In 1918, during World War I, the 81st Division sailed for France after training at Fort Jackson, South Carolina.  On their left shoulder the men of the division wore an olive drab felt patch with the silhouette of a wildcat - after Wildcat Creek, a stream that flows through Fort Jackson.  When men of the other fighting divisions challenged the right of 81st soldiers to wear the patch, General John J. Pershing ruled that the 81st could keep this distinctive insignia.  He also suggested that other divisions adopt shoulder patches of their own. This patch was officially adopted by the U.S. Army on October 19, 1918.  The first patches were often primitive but by World War II, the manufacture was regulated.

By World War II, all army groups, field armies, corps, and divisions, as well as all major Army commands, had unique SSI. These SSI would often be created with symbolism alluding to the unit's formation. Examples include the 82nd Airborne Division, which included an "AA" on its patch alluding to the "All-American" soldiers from every state that made it up, and the 29th Infantry Division, which included blue and grey to allude to soldiers that made it up being from states on both sides of the American Civil War.

Most US formations had unique patches which varied greatly in size and makeup, with the exception of U.S. armored divisions (as well as 1st Armored Corps and the U.S. Army Armor Center & School), all of which adopted the same patch (a yellow, red and blue triangle with a symbol for armor in the middle). Each division and I Armored Corps then included its number in the upper yellow portion of the patch to distinguish it. The SSIs of those armored units which survived into the Cold War became irregular pentagons (some units later than others) with the addition of rectangular section at the bottom, bearing the division's nickname or "U.S. Army Armor Center".

Subdued patches and insignia were introduced during the Vietnam War and were made mandatory for wear on the field uniform starting July 1, 1970.

SSIs are generally authorized only for units commanded by a general officer. In the early 1960s, separate armor regiments began creating SSI, and the number of separate brigades increased. Today, most separate brigades have their own SSI, but those brigades permanently assigned to divisions do not.  A handful of smaller units have SSI (including the U.S. Army's ranger battalions [all of which have identical SSIs apart from the number], Trial Defense Service, and Headquarters & Headquarters Company, U.S. Army), but most units of battalion level and smaller do not have SSIs of their own.  A handful of SSIs are designated for use by units which are not under a unified command wearing that SSI; these include Special Forces, Department of the Army Staff Support, and the SSI designated for soldiers assigned outside of DOD (e.g., military attachés).

See also

 Distinctive unit insignia
 Divisional Insignia of the British Army
 Formation badges for the British Army equivalent
 Tactical recognition flash

Shoulder sleeve insignia galleries
 Field Army insignia of the United States Army
 Corps Insignia of the United States Army
 Division insignia of the United States Army
 Brigade insignia of the United States Army
 Miscellaneous shoulder sleeve insignia of the United States Army

References

Further reading
 Dalessandro, Robert J. & Knapp, Michael G., Organization and Insignia of the American Expeditionary Forces, 1917–1923, (Atglen, PA: Schiffer Publishing) 2008.

External links

 Institute of Heraldry Shoulder Sleeve Insignia website
 Airborne & Special Operations Insignia from Army Quartermaster Museum
 US Army Patches & Crests

1918 establishments in France
Heraldry of the United States Army
Military equipment introduced in the 1910s
United States Army shoulder
United States Army uniforms
United States military unit insignia